Preethi Madu Thamashe Nodu (Make Love and Look Funny) is a 1979 Indian Kannada-language romantic comedy film, directed by C. V. Rajendran and produced by Dwarakish. The film stars Srinath, Shankar Nag, Dwarakish and Manjula and Padmapriya. The film has musical score by Rajan–Nagendra. It is a remake of the 1964 Tamil film Kadhalikka Neramillai.

Plot

Cast 

 Srinath
 Shankar Nag
 Dwarakish
 Manjula
 Padmapriya
 Balakrishna
 Narasimharaju
 Thoogudeepa Srinivas
 Musuri Krishnamurthy
 Pramila Joshai
 Uma Shivakumar
 Shanthala
 Rani
 Tiger Prabhakar in Guest Appearance
 Shakti Prasad in Guest Appearance
 Hanumanthachar
 Nagaraj
 Bheema Rao
 Shivaji Rao
 Kunigal Ramanath
 Comedian Guggu
 Manmatha Rao
 Kannada Raju
 Ashwath Narayan

Soundtrack 
The music was composed by Rajan–Nagendra All four songs were sung by S P Balasubramanyam and S Janaki which is a landmark .

References

External links 
 

1970s Kannada-language films
Films directed by C. V. Rajendran
Films scored by Rajan–Nagendra
Indian romantic comedy films
Kannada remakes of Tamil films